Teenage Rebel is a 1956 American drama film directed by Edmund Goulding and starring Ginger Rogers and Michael Rennie. It was nominated for two Academy Awards; Best Costume Design and Best Art Direction (Lyle R. Wheeler, Jack Martin Smith, Walter M. Scott, and Stuart A. Reiss).

The film was an adaptation of the play A Roomful of Roses by Edith Sommer, with Betty Lou Keim and Warren Berlinger reprising their Broadway roles. Teenage Rebel was the first black-and-white CinemaScope film.

Plot
Nancy Fallon (Ginger Rogers) is a divorcee who has trouble communicating with her 15-year-old daughter Dodie (Betty Lou Keim). Left in the custody of her father (Michael Rennie), Dodie feels as though her mother has deserted her.

Cast
 Ginger Rogers as Nancy Fallon
 Michael Rennie as Jay Fallon
 Mildred Natwick as Grace Hewitt
 Rusty Swope as Larry Fallon
 Lili Gentle as Gloria, teenager at the races
 Louise Beavers as Willamay, Fallon's Maid
 Irene Hervey as Helen Sheldon McGowan
 John Stephenson as Eric McGowan, Dodie's Dad
 Betty Lou Keim as Dorothy 'Dodie' McGowan
 Warren Berlinger as Dick Hewitt
 Diane Jergens as Jane Hewitt

Original play
The film was based on a play, A Roomful of Roses, written by Edith Sommer. It was bought for production in 1954 bu Guthrie McClintock and Stanley Gilkek. In June 1955 Patricia Neal agreed to star.

The play premiered on October 17. The New York Times said the acting was "winning" and it was "written with humanity".

Linda Darnell later made her stage debut in a production of the play in Phoenix Arizona.

Production
Film rights were purchased by 20th Century Fox before the play was even produced. In May 1955 Darryl F. Zanuck assigned the play to Sam Engel to produce.

According to writer Walter Reisch, 20th Century Fox had a commitment with Ginger Rogers and bought the play as a vehicle for her. Rogers' casting was announced in May 1956.

Reisch later said it was one of his favorite films, saying "It was a beautiful idea: a girl, the daughter of a woman who had meanwhile remarried, comes to the house to meet her new family. [Edmund] Goulding directed it. We only used the nucleus, the germ of the play, and made a lovely picture, a big success. But it was in black-and-white CinemaScope; again we couldn't get the color camera."

The film was known as Our Teenage Daughter and Dodie before Fox settled on Teenage Rebel. In June 1956 Betty Lou Kenim was cast in her stage role. Filming started in June 1956. The movie was the only film being shot on the Fox lot.

References

External links
 
 
 
 

1956 films
1956 drama films
1950s teen drama films
1950s English-language films
American teen drama films
American black-and-white films
American films based on plays
Films directed by Edmund Goulding
Films produced by Charles Brackett
Films with screenplays by Charles Brackett
Films scored by Leigh Harline
20th Century Fox films
CinemaScope films
1950s American films